The following is a partial list of rivers of British Columbia, organized by watershed.  Some large creeks are included either because of size or historical importance
(See Alphabetical List of British Columbia rivers ).  Also included are lakes that are "in-line" connecting upper tributaries of listed rivers, or at their heads.

Arctic drainage
Arctic Ocean via Mackenzie River drainage
(NB Liard tributaries on Yukon side of border omitted)

Liard River watershed
Liard River
Petiewewtot River
Fort Nelson River
Sahtaneh River
Snake River
Muskwa River
Prophet River
Minaker River
Besa River
Tetsa River
Chischa River
Tuchodi River
Sikanni Chief River
Buckinghorse River
Fontas River
Dunedin River
Beaver River
Toad River
West Toad River
Racing River
Schipa River
Grayling River
Trout River
Vents River
Smith River
Coal River
Rabbit River
Gundahoo River
Kechika River
Red River
Turnagain River
Major Hart River
Dall River
Cassiar River
Gataga River
Frog River
Dease River
Cottonwood River
Blue River
Rapid River
Little Rancheria River

Peace River
Redwillow River (Smoky River, Alberta, drainage)
Wapiti River (Smoky River, Alberta, drainage)
Narraway River
Pouce Coupe River
Alces River
Kiskatinaw River
West Kiskatinaw River
Beatton River
Doig River
Osborn River
Blueberry River
Pine River
Murray River
Wolverine River
Sukunka River
Moberly River
Moberly Lake
Halfway River
Cameron River
Graham River
Chowade River
Nabesche River
Wicked River

Williston Lake (Parsnip Reach)
Manson River
Nation River
Pack River
McLeod Lake
Crooked River
Summit Lake
McLeod River
Carp Lake
Parsnip River
Misinchinka River

Williston Lake (Omineca Reach)

Omineca River
Mesilinka River
Osilinka River
Ingenika River
Swannell River

Williston Lake (Finlay Reach)

Ospika River
Finlay River
Akie River
Kwadacha River
Warneford River
North Kwadacha River
Fox River
McCook River
Obo River
Toodoggone River
Firesteel River
Sturdee River
Thutade Lake - Source of the Peace River

Pacific drainage ("Pacific Slope")
(Pacific Ocean watershed; Columbia tributaries on US side of border omitted)

Columbia River watershed
Columbia River
Horsethief Creek
Forster Creek
Templeton River
Spillimacheen River
Kicking Horse River
Little Yoho River
Yoho River
Emerald River
Kiwetinok River
Amiskwi River
Otterhead River
Ottertail River
Ice River
Beaverfoot River
Blaeberry River
Beaver River
Bush River
Valenciennes River
Wood River
Canoe River
Goldstream River
Palmer Creek
Illecillewaet River
Incomappleux River
Beaton Creek
Kootenay River
Vermilion River
Cross River
Palliser River
Lussier River
St. Mary River
Wild Horse River
Bull River
Elk River
Fording River
Coal Creek
Wigwam River
Yahk River
Moyie River
Goat River
Duncan River
Lardeau River
Slocan River
Little Slocan River
Percy Creek (Slocan River)
White River
Pend d'Oreille River
Flathead River (via the Clark Fork)
Salmo River
Kettle River
Granby River
West Kettle River
Okanagan River
Similkameen River
Pasayten River
Tulameen River
Shingle Creek
Mission Creek
Whiteman Creek
Marron River

Strait of Georgia

Howe Sound
Rainy River
Deeks Creek
Lions Creek
M Creek
Furry Creek
Britannia Creek
Shannon Creek
Woodfibre Creek
Stawamus River
Squamish River
Mamquam River
Ring Creek
Skookum Creek
Cheakamus River
Cheekye River
Brohm River
Rubble Creek
Daisy Lake
Cheakamus River
Brandywine Creek
Cheakamus Lake
Cheakamus River
Alpha Lake Creek
Alpha Lake
Nita Creek
Nita Lake
Whistler Creek
Callaghan Creek
Ashlu Creek
Elaho River
Clendinning Creek

Jervis Inlet
Vancouver River
Deserted River
Loquilts Creek
Skwawka River
Alfred Creek
Brittain River

Sechelt Inlet
Clowhom River
Tzoonie River

Malaspina Strait
Lois River
Powell River
Powell Lake
Daniels River

Desolation Sound watershed

Theodosia Inlet
Theodosia River

Toba Inlet
Toba River
Tahumming River

Bute Inlet
Homathko River
Tatlayoko Lake
Mosley Creek
Southgate River
Bishop River

Knight Inlet
Klinaklini River
West Klinaklini River
McClinchy Creek
One Eye Lake

North Bentinck Arm/Dean Channel
Necleetsconnay River
Bella Coola River
Atnarko River
Hotnarko River
Talchako River
Salloomt River
Nusatsum River
Noosgulch River
Dean River
Sakumtha River
Takia River
Kimsquit River

South Bentinck Arm
Asseek River
Taleomey River
Noeick River

Douglas Channel/Gardner Canal
Tsaytis River
Kitlope River
Gamsby River
Kapella River
Kitlope Lake
Tezwa River
Kitkiata Inlet
Quaal River
Kemano River
Kitimat River

Fraser River - Source to the Willow River
Moose River
Moose Lake
Robson River
Swiftcurrent Creek
McLennan River
Tete Creek
Kiwa Creek
Raush River
Holmes River
Castle Creek
Doré River
McKale River
West Twin Creek
East Twin Creek
Goat River
Milk River
Morkill River
Torpy River
Bowron River
McGregor River
Herrick Creek
Salmon River
Willow River

Nechako River

Stuart River
Stuart Lake
Necoslie River
Pinchi Creek
Pinchi Lake
Tsilcoh River
Ocock River
Tachie River
Kuzkwa River
Tezzeron Lake
Trembleur Lake
Middle River
Takla Lake
Sakeniche River
Natowite Lake
Driftwood River
Kotsine River
Endako River
Tchesinkut River
Tchesinkut Lake
Burns Lake
Nautley River
Fraser Lake
Stellako River
François Lake
Nadina River
Cheslatta River
Cheslatta Lake
Bryan Arm
Chelaslie Arm
Nechako Reservoir
Tetachuck Lake
Allin Bay
Natalkuz Lake
Chedakuz Arm
Knewstubb Lake
Murray Lake
Euchu Reach
Entiako River
Entiako Lake
Chief Louis Arm
Ootsa Lake
Tahtsa Reach, Tahtsa Lake
Tahtsa River
Whitesail Lake
Zinc Bay
Little Whitesail Lake
Troitsa Lake
Troitsa River

Fraser River - Nechako to Thompson Rivers
Cottonwood River
Swift River
John Boyd Creek
Mary Creek
Quesnel River
Cariboo River
Little River
Matthew River
Lanezi Lake
Isaac Lake
Wolverine River
Quesnel Lake
Roaring River
Mitchell River
Mitchel Lake
Niagara Creek
Horsefly River
Horsefly Lake
West Road or Blackwater River
Soda Creek
Duckworth Lake
McLeese Creek
McLeese Lake
Sheridan Creek
Williams Lake River
Missioner Creek
Reservoir Lake
Williams Lake
San Jose River
Chilcotin River
Chilko River
Taseko River
Taseko Lake
Lord River
Tchaikazan River
Chilko Lake
Edmond River
Chilanko River
Churn Creek
Bridge River
Yalakom River
Carpenter Lake
Marshall Creek
Marshall Lake
Tyaughton Creek
Liza Creek
Liza Lake
Tyaughton Lake
Tyaughton Creek
Relay Creek
Noaxe Creek
Gun Creek
Lajoie Creek
Gun Lake
Lajoie Creek
Lajoie Lake
Leckie Creek
Slim Creek
Bridge River
Hurley River
Cadwallader Creek
Downton Lake
Bridge River
Nichols Creek
Seton River or Seton Creek
Cayoosh Creek
Duffey Lake
Cayoosh Creek
Seton Lake
Seton River or Seton Portage River
Anderson Lake
McGillivray Creek
Haylmore Creek
Gates River
Stein River

Thompson River
Botanie Creek
Nicoamen River
Skoonka Creek
Murray Creek
Nicola River
Spius Creek
Coldwater River
Nicola Lake
Quilchena Creek
Oregon Jack Creek
Bonaparte River
Cache Creek
Hat Creek
Rayfield River
Deadman River
Kamloops Lake
Tranquille River
South Thompson River
Monte Creek
Chase Creek
Little Shuswap Lake
Little River
Shuswap Lake
Adams River
Seymour River
Anstey River
Eagle River
Perry River
Sicamous Narrows
Mara Lake
Shuswap River
Mabel Lake
Wap Creek
Sugar Lake
Shuswap River
Tsuius Creek
Joss Creek
Salmon River
North Thompson River
Barrière River
Clearwater River
Mahood River
Mahood Lake
Canim River
Canim Lake
Bridge Creek
Murtle River
Clearwater Lake
Azure River
Azure Lake
Angus Horne Lake
Raft River
Mad River
Blue River
Mud Creek
Thunder River
Albreda River

Fraser River below Thompson River
Ainslie Creek (formerly Nine Mile Creek)
Nahatlatch River
Anderson River
Coquihalla River
Nicolum River
Ruby Creek
Sumas River
Vedder River or Chilliwack River
Sweltzer River
Slesse Creek
Depot Creek
Harrison River
Chehalis River
Chehalis Lake
Harrison Lake
Silver River
Tretheway Creek
Tipella Creek
Lillooet River
Sloquet Creek
Fire Creek
Snowcap Creek
Lillooet Lake
Joffre Creek
Birkenhead River
Birkenhead Lake
Taillefer Creek
Green River
Rutherford Creek
Soo River
Green Lake
Rainbow Creek
River of Golden Dreams or Alta Creek
Alta Lake
Brio Creek
Fitzsimmons Creek
Ryan River
Meager Creek
Salal Creek
Norrish Creek
Hatzic Slough
Hatzic Lake
Hatzic Creek
Durieu Creek
D'Herbomez Creek
Silver Creek
Stave River
Silvermere Lake
Hayward Lake
Steelhead Creek
Stave Lake
McConnell Creek
Cascade Creek
Terepocki Creek
Winslow Creek
Tingle Creek
Stave River
Piluk Creek
Whonnock Creek
Kanaka Creek
McNutt Creek
Pitt River
Alouette River
Alouette Lake
Gold Creek
Widgeon Creek
Pitt Lake
Pitt River
Coquitlam River
Coquitlam Lake

Brunette River
Burnaby Lake
Still Creek

Rivers of North Vancouver 
Capilano River
Seymour River
MacKay Creek
Mosquito Creek
Lynn Creek

Skagit Bay/Puget Sound (U.S.)
Skagit River
Sumallo River
Ross Lake
Skagit River

Boundary Bay

Nicomekl River
Serpentine River
Campbell River

English Bay
Capilano River

Burrard Inlet

Mosquito Creek
Seymour River
Lynn Creek
Capilano River
Mackay Creek
Marr Creek
Lawson Creek
Cypress Creek
Eagle Creek
Nelson Creek

Indian Arm

Percy Creek (Indian Arm)
Buntzen Lake (via tunnels)
Indian River

Watersheds East of the Alaska Panhandle
(south and east of the Chilkoot Pass)
Salmon River
Unuk River (Alaska and British Columbia)
Eulachon River (Alaska)
Blue River (Alaska)
Lava Fork (AK and BC)
Lava Lakes
Hell Roaring Creek (Alaska)
Harrymel Creek
King Creek
South Unuk River
Gracey Creek
Sulphurets Creek

 Stikine River
 Kikahe River
 Katete River (source is in Alaska)
 West Fork Katete River
 Tasakili River
 Iskut River
 Johnson River
 Inhini River
 Hoodoo River
 Craig River
 Jekill River
 Twin River
 Verrett River
 Snippaker Creek
 McLymont Creek
 Forrest Kerr Creek
 Volcano Creek
 Ningunsaw River
 Bob Quinn Creek
 Alger Creek
 Beaverpond Creek
 Devil Creek
 Ball Creek
 Burrage Creek
 Little Iskut River
 Todagin Creek
 Tsatia Creek
 Porcupine River
 Flood River
 Scud River
 Chutine River
 Barrington River
 Mess Creek
 Tahltan River
 Hartz Creek
 Middle Creek
 Riley Creek
 Beatty Creek
 Bear Creek
 Little Tahltan River
 Tuya River
 Classy Creek
 Little Tuya River
 Mansfield Creek
 Klastline River
 Tanzilla River
 Klappan River
 Little Klappan River
 McBride River
 Kehlechoa River
 Pitman River
 Tucho River
 Spatsizi River
 Ross River
 Dawson River
 Kluayetz Creek
 Chukachida River

Whiting River (estuary is in Alaska)
South Whiting River
Taku River
Sittakanay River (confluence with the Taku is in Alaska)
Tulsequah River
Inklin River (joins Nakina River to form Taku River)
Yeth Creek
Sutlahine River
Sheslay River (joins Nahlin River to form Inklin River)
Tatsatua Creek
Samotua River
Hackett River
Nahlin River (joins Sheslay River to form Inklin River)
Dudidontu River
Koshin River
Nakina River (joins Inklin River to form Taku River)
Sloko River
Nakonake River
Silver Salmon River

Watersheds North of the Alaska Panhandle
(west of the Chilkoot Pass)
Alsek River (mouth in Alaska, source at confluence of Kaskawulsh and Dezadeash Rivers in Yukon Territory)
Tatshenshini River (BC and Yukon)
Tkope River
O'Connor River
Klukshu River (Yukon Territory)
Blanchard River (BC and Yukon)
Parton River
Bates River (Yukon)
Kaskawulsh River (Yukon)
Dusty River (Yukon)
Jarvis River (Yukon)
Dezadeash River (Yukon)
Aishihik River (Yukon)
Dezadeash Lake (Yukon)
Chilcat River (sp. Chilkat in Alaska)
Flemer River
Tahini River (NB different from Takhini River, which is in same area and runs the other way)
Kelsall River
Kelsall Lake (Glacier Camp Pass)
Klehini River

Marcus Passage watershed
Oriflamme Passage
Portland Inlet
Khutzeymateen Inlet
Khutzeymateen River
Kateen River
Ksi X'anmas or Kwinamass River
Nass Bay, Mill Bay
Ksi Gingolx or Kincolith River
'Nass River'
Xnukw or Iknouk River
Ishkheenickh River or Ksi Hlginx
Tseax River or Ksi Sii Aks
Kwinatahl River or Ksi Gwinhat'al
Tchitin River
Kinskuch River
Cranberry River
Kiteen River
White River
Flat River
Meziadin River, Meziadin Lake
Bell-Irving River
Bowser River, Bowser Lake
Treaty Creek
Kwinageese River
Taylor River
West Taylor River
Portland Canal
Bear River
Observatory Inlet
Alice Arm
Illiance River
Kitsault River
Dak River
West Kitsault River
Hastings Arm
Kshwan River
'Skeena River'
McNeil River
Ayton Creek
Ecstall River
Windsor River
Khyex River
Scotia River
Khtada River
Kasiks River
Exchamsiks River
Gitnadoix River
Exstew River
Shames River
Lakelse River
Lakelse Lake, Furlong Bay
Zymagotitz River
Kitsumkalum River
Kitsumkalum Lake
Nelson River
Kitsumkalum River
Cedar River
Zymoetz River
Clore River
Burnie River
Kitnayakwa River
Kitwanga River
Kitseguecla River
Bulkley River
Suskwa River
Telkwa River
Toboggan Creek
Morice River
Thautil River
Morice Lake, Atna Bay
Nanika River
Atna River
Kispiox River
Sweetin River
Nangeese River
East Kispiox River
Shegunia River
Babine River
Shelagyote River
Nilkitkwa River
West Nilkitkwa River
Babine Lake
Fulton River
Sutherland River
Sicintine River
Slamgeesh River
Squinguila River
Sustut River
Bear River
Asitka River
Mosque River
Duti River
Kluatantan River

Queen Charlotte Sound watershed

Douglas Channel watershed
Gardner Canal
Alan Reach
Kiltuish Inlet
Kiltuish River
Europa Reach
Brim River
Barrie Reach
Kemano River
Whidbey Reach
Chief Matthews Bay
Kowesas River
Kitlope River
Tsaytis River
Kitlope Lake
Tezwa River
Kalitan Creek
Gamsby River
Tenaiko Creek
Kapella River
Kitimat Arm
Kitimat River
Kildala Arm
Kildala River
Watt Creek

Dean Channel watershed
Kimsquit River
Dean River
Burke Channel
Kwatna Inlet
Quatlena River
Kwatna River (via Kwatna Bay)
North Bentinck Arm
Bella Coola River
Atnarko River
Talchako River
Necleetsconnay River
South Bentinck Arm
Taleomey River
Noeick River
Smitley River

Queen Charlotte Strait watershed
Knight Inlet
Klinaklini River
West Klinaklini River
Namu River
Koeye River
Rivers Inlet
Wannock River
Owikeno Lake
Sheemahant River
Machmell River
Neechantz River
Tzeo River
Washwash River
Inziana River
Kingcome Inlet
Kingcome River
Atlatzi River
Clear River
Satsalla River
Wakeman Sound
Wakeman River
Atwaykellesse River
Tribune Channel
Bond Sound
Ahta River
Thompson Sound
Kakweiken River

Islands of the British Columbia Coast watersheds
Canoona River (Princess Royal Island)

Rivers of Vancouver Island

Broughton Strait–Queen Charlotte Strait watersheds
Kokish River
Nimpkish River
Nimpkish Lake
Woss Creek
Davie River
Keogh River
Quatsie River
Tsuiquate River
Shushartie River
Nahwitti River
Stranby River

Discovery Passage–Johnstone Strait watersheds
Campbell River
Quinsam River
Iron River
Chute Creek
John Hart Lake
Lower Campbell Lake
Greenstone Creek
Upper Campbell Lake
Elk River
Cervus Creek
Buttle Lake
Wolf River
Ralph River
Shepherd Creek
Myra Creek
Thelwood Creek
Salmon River
White River
Memkay River
Middle Memkay River
North Memkay River
Adam River
Eve River
Tsitika River

Strait of Georgia watersheds
Goldstream River
Goldstream Lake
Shawnigan River
Shawnigan Lake
Koksilah River
Cowichan River
Cowichan Lake
Robertson River
Chemainus River
Chipman Creek
Nanaimo River
Sadie Creek
South Nanaimo River
Jump Creek
Dunsmuir Creek
North Nanaimo River
Haslam Creek
North Haslam Creek
Chase River
Englishman River
South Englishman River
Little Qualicum River
Cameron Lake
Cameron River
Qualicum River
Horne Lake
Tsable River
Trent River
Bloedel Creek
Courtenay River
Puntledge River
Browns River
Tsolum River
Comox Lake
Cruickshank River
Comox Creek
Oyster River
Little Oyster River
Piggott Creek

West Coast of Vancouver Island watersheds

Alberni Inlet-Barkley Sound
Black River
Pachena River
Sarita River
South Sarita River
Franklin River
Corrigan Creek
China Creek
Somass River
Stamp River
Ash River
Great Central Lake
Drinkwater Creek
Sproat River
Sproat Lake
Taylor River

Clayoquot Sound
Cous Creek
Nahmint River
Effingham River
Toquart River
Kennedy River
Kennedy Lake
Clayoquot River
Sand River
Tofino Creek
Bedwell River
Ursus Creek
Cypress River
Moyena River
Atleo River
Megin River
Talbot Creek
Sydney River
Hesquiat River
Hesquiat Lake
Houston River
Jacklah River
Burman River
Bancroft Creek

Nootka Sound
Gold River
Ucana River
Donner Lake
Heber River
Saunders Creek
Upana River
Muchalat River
Muchalat Lake
Oktwanch River
Tlupana River
Nesook River
Conuma River
Sucowa River
Leiner River
Tahsis River
Zeballos River
Nomash River
Kaouk River
Artlish River
Tahsish River
Kwois Creek
Marble River
Alice Lake
Benson River
Raging River
Victoria Lake
Teihsum River
Waukwaas River
Goodspeed River
MacJack River
San Josef River
Fisherman River

Strait of Juan de Fuca watersheds
Darling River
Klanawa River
East Klanawa River
Nitinat River
Nitinat Lake
Caycuse River
Little Nitinat River
Carmanah Creek
Walbran Creek
San Juan River
Gordon River
Fleet River
Sombrio River
Loss Creek
Jack Elliott Creek
Noyse Creek
Jordan River
Sooke River
Leech River
Sooke Lake
Colquitz River

Haida Gwaii watersheds
Ain River
Hiellen River
Salmon River
Slatechuck Creek
Tlell River
Yakoun River

Bering Sea (Yukon River) watershed

Note that only tributaries of the Yukon River in British Columbia are given; those in Yukon or Alaska are omitted.
Kusawa River
Hendon River
Takhini River
Primrose River
Partridge Lake
Partridge River
Bennett Lake
Lake Lindeman
Lindeman Creek (from Chilkoot Pass)
Homan River
Tagish Lake
Taku Arm
Swanson River
Fantail River
Graham Inlet
Racine Creek
Tutshi River (from White Pass)
East Tutshi River
Atlin Lake
Surprise Creek
Surprise Lake
Torres Channel
O'Donnel River
Pike River
Teslin Lake
Jennings River
Teslin River
Kedahda River
Hayes River
Swift River
Gladys River

See also
 List of rivers of Canada
 List of rivers of the Americas
 List of rivers of British Columbia (alphabetical)

British Columbia|*
 
Rivers